Phanom Phrai is a district (amphoe) in the southeastern part of Roi Et province, northeastern Thailand.

Geography
Neighboring districts are (from the southwest clockwise): Nong Hi, Suwannaphum, At Samat, Selaphum of Roi Et Province; Mueang Yasothon, Kham Khuean Kaeo, Maha Chana Chai of Yasothon province; and Sila Lat of Sisaket province.

Administration
The district is divided into 13 sub-districts (tambons), which are further subdivided into 160 villages (mubans). Phanom Phrai is a township (thesaban tambon) which covers parts of tambon Phanom Phrai. There are a further 13 tambon administrative organizations (TAO).

Missing numbers are tambons which now form Nong Hi District.

References

Phanom Phrai